The Teenage Mutant Ninja Turtles, a fictional superhero team created by Kevin Eastman and Peter Laird, have appeared in six theatrical feature-length films since their debut. The first film was released in 1990, at the height of the franchise's popularity. Despite mixed reviews from critics, it was a commercial success that garnered two direct sequels, Teenage Mutant Ninja Turtles II: The Secret of the Ooze in 1991 and Teenage Mutant Ninja Turtles III in 1993, both of which were modest successes.

During a revival of the franchise prompted by the successful 2003–2009 TV series, a separate computer-animated film titled TMNT was released in 2007. A fifth film by Paramount Pictures was released in 2014 and served as a reboot to the live-action films. A sequel, Teenage Mutant Ninja Turtles: Out of the Shadows, was released in 2016 and was the first film in the franchise to be considered financially unsuccessful.

The six films have grossed $1.2 billion worldwide. A computer-animated reboot film, Teenage Mutant Ninja Turtles: Mutant Mayhem is scheduled to release in theaters in 2023.

List of films

Original film series (1990–1993)

Teenage Mutant Ninja Turtles (1990) 

The first film, Teenage Mutant Ninja Turtles, closely follows the storyline from the Mirage comic books, in addition to some of the more lighthearted elements of the cartoons. The film tells the origin story of Splinter and the Turtles, their initial encounters with April O'Neil (Judith Hoag) and Casey Jones (Elias Koteas), and their first confrontation with The Shredder and his Foot Clan. Directed by Steve Barron and released by New Line Cinema, the film showcases the innovative puppetry techniques of Jim Henson's Creature Shop.

Teenage Mutant Ninja Turtles II: The Secret of the Ooze (1991) 

A sequel, Teenage Mutant Ninja Turtles II: The Secret of the Ooze, expands on the Turtles' origin story while claiming the distinction as Vanilla Ice's film debut. The film was dedicated to puppeteer Jim Henson. It also introduced the Turtles' human friend Keno (Ernie Reyes Jr.) and Shredder's mutant henchmen Tokka and Rahzar. This film was internationally released by 20th Century Fox.

Teenage Mutant Ninja Turtles III (1993) 

A sequel, Teenage Mutant Ninja Turtles III, features Elias Koteas reprising his role as Casey Jones. The plot revolves around the "Sacred Sands of Time", a mystical scepter which transports the Turtles and April back in time to feudal Japan, where they become embroiled in a conflict between a daimyō and a group of rebellious villagers.

TMNT (2007) 

A  computer-animated feature film written and directed by Kevin Munroe, was released March 23, 2007. Produced by Imagi Animation Studios and distributed by The Weinstein Company in the United States and Warner Bros. Pictures internationally, it was the final Ninja Turtles movie to be distributed by Warner Bros. due to the franchise being purchased by Viacom. The film sees the four Turtles having grown apart after their final defeat of their arch-enemy, the Shredder, but are set to reunite and overcome their faults to save the world as evil ancient creatures threaten it.

Reboot film series (2014–2016)

Teenage Mutant Ninja Turtles (2014) 

A new feature film, rebooting the film franchise, was originally scheduled to be released in December 2013 as part of the acquisition of the franchise by Viacom. Michael Bay's Platinum Dunes production company landed the rights to the new film in May 2010. The film is a co-production between Paramount Pictures and Nickelodeon Movies. The first film was directed by Jonathan Liebesman and stars Megan Fox as April O'Neil, Will Arnett, William Fichtner, and features motion capture CGI for the Turtles and Splinter, the film was released on August 8, 2014. The film became a box office success.

Teenage Mutant Ninja Turtles: Out of the Shadows (2016) 

A sequel, Teenage Mutant Ninja Turtles: Out of the Shadows was directed by Dave Green. The original cast (with the exception of Johnny Knoxville) returns with Stephen Amell, Brian Tee, Tyler Perry, and Gary Anthony Williams joining as Casey Jones, Shredder, Baxter Stockman, and Bebop respectively. WWE wrestler Sheamus portrays Rocksteady.

Teenage Mutant Ninja Turtles: Mutant Mayhem (2023) 

In June 2020, it was reported that Nickelodeon Animation Studio was developing a computer-animated Teenage Mutant Ninja Turtles film for Paramount Pictures. Seth Rogen, Evan Goldberg, and James Weaver would produce the film through their company, Point Grey Pictures. Jeff Rowe was set to direct the film, with Brendan O'Brien writing the screenplay. It is scheduled for release on August 4, 2023.

Other films

Turtles Forever (2009) 

In celebration of the 25th anniversary of the franchise, a television film titled Turtles Forever aired on TheCW4Kids on November 21, 2009. It was a crossover between the original comic, the 1987 television series, and the then-current incarnation, whilst also serving as a finale to the latter.

Batman vs. Teenage Mutant Ninja Turtles (2019) 

A film adaptation of the crossover comic book miniseries Batman/Teenage Mutant Ninja Turtles produced by Warner Bros. Animation, DC Entertainment and Nickelodeon, was released digitally on May 14 and on Blu-ray and Ultra HD Blu-ray on June 4, 2019. In the film, Batman, Batgirl and Robin forge an alliance with The Teenage Mutant Ninja Turtles to fight against the Turtles' sworn enemy, The Shredder, who has teamed up with Ra's Al Ghul and the League of Assassins.

Rise of the Teenage Mutant Ninja Turtles: The Movie (2022) 

A film continuation of the 2018 TV series Rise of the Teenage Mutant Ninja Turtles was developed by Nickelodeon for Netflix. The film follows Leonardo as he is forced to lead his brothers to save the world from the Krang. The film was released on August 5, 2022.

Paramount+ films 
In February 2022, at the ViacomCBS’ Investors Event, a number of spin-off films were announced to be in development. Each film will center around a villain in the franchise, with the projects being developed by Nickelodeon Animation for streaming exclusively released on Paramount+.

Recurring cast and crew
 A  indicates the actor or actress portrayed their character through a costume.
 A  indicates a performance through motion-capture technology.
 A  indicates a performance through puppetry.
 A  indicates the actor or actress was uncredited for their role.
 A  indicates a performance through voice-work.
 A  indicates an actor or actress portrayed a younger version of their character.

Cast

Additional crew

Reception

Box office performance

Critical and public response

Live-action films

Animated films

Music

Soundtracks

Future 
In June 2018, it was reported that Paramount Pictures will once again reboot the live-action series with Bay, Fuller and Form returning to produce the film and Andrew Dodge writing the script. Fuller and Form announced while at the 24th Critics' Choice Awards that production on the reboot is set to start in 2019, but in July, TMNT co-creator Kevin Eastman revealed that the film is still in development and believed that Paramount took the reactions to the 2014 and 2016 films "to heart", and that "its going to be a next-level type of stuff". In August 2021, Colin Jost and Casey Jost were announced to be doing a rewrite of the script.

Canceled projects

Untitled Teenage Mutant Ninja Turtles III sequel
Kevin Eastman was working on a fourth Teenage Mutant Ninja Turtles film between 1995 and 1997 titled TMNT 4: The Next Mutation or TMNT 4: The Foot Walks Again. In 2012, Heritage Auctions published concept arts showing a fifth turtle named Kirby, but also featured are Fang, Shredder, Spyder, Nano Spyder, Super Shredder, Casey, Talbot, Lawson, Bugman and "Evil April". Peter Laird showed some concept art of the Turtles and Splinter on his blog. The main concept behind the film would have the turtles undergo a second mutation due to the mutagen in the heroes' bloodstream beginning to change with age and giving them new abilities and new problems. Also, the film would revolve around the return of the Shredder and proceeded to rebuild the Foot empire.

John Fusco-written film

In late April 2009, a new live-action film was announced to be in the works for a 2011 release. Mirage Studios was partnering with producers Scott Mednick and Galen Walker, with Peter Laird, Gary Richardson, Frederick Fierst, Eric Crown as executive producers, and 4Kids Entertainment handling the film's merchandising with Lightbox Productions, LLC. funding the project. The film would have used animatronic suits whose facial expressions would be digitally enhanced in post-production. It was stated that the story would focus on the Turtles origin. A few months later, an open casting call was made for extras to play as members of the Foot Clan with Ernie Reyes, Jr. as an acting judge. "Ninja Turtles" co-creator Peter Laird said "there were a lot of positive feelings about a Batman Begins-style reboot, while producer Galen Walker said the film would be headed in a darker direction. In July the same year, John Fusco was hired to be the film's writer. His version was to be inspired by the original dark and gritty black and white comics that Eastman created with Peter Laird, but Paramount wasn't on board. Kevin Eastman described the script as being "too edgy for what Paramount wanted". Laird revealed the film would have been a direct sequel to the 1990 film while ignoring its earlier sequels. In October, Viacom's subsidiary network Nickelodeon had purchased all of Mirage's rights to the Teenage Mutant Ninja Turtles property for $9.75 million, thus terminating all deals with 4Kids and Time Warner.

TMNT sequels
In 2007 Kevin Munroe stated that he would like to direct a possible sequel to TMNT, possibly involving the return of the Shredder. Munroe planned a trilogy. TMNT 2 would have loosely adapted the Turtles’ 13-part comic book saga "City At War". Michelangelo would have felt rejected and joined the Foot Clan, while the Turtles would have traveled to Japan and would have crossed paths with Karai and Shredder. TMNT 3 would have featured the Triceratons as well as the Technodrome’s arrival from Dimension X. Munroe wanted Michael Clarke Duncan to voice the Triceraton's leader, Commander Mozar. In an interview, Peter Laird stated he was interested in the idea of having the next film be a live-action and CGI hybrid film, with the Turtles rendered in CGI and Sarah Michelle Gellar and Chris Evans reprising their TMNT roles in live-action.

Out of the Shadows sequel
In August 2014, Noel Fisher stated in an interview that he and the other Turtle actors had signed on for three films. Megan Fox had also signed on for three films. In May 2016, Tyler Perry said that if a third film was made, his character, Baxter Stockman, would probably mutate into his fly form during the movie. Pete Ploszek also expressed his interests in reprising his role in a third film as Leonardo. In October the same year, in light of the second film's financial failure, producer Andrew Form indicated that a third film was unlikely.

References

American film series
Action film series
Comedy film series
Film series introduced in 1990
Science fiction film series
New Line Cinema franchises
Warner Bros. Pictures franchises
Paramount Pictures franchises